One Man's Way is a 1963 American drama film directed by Denis Sanders and written by John W. Bloch and Eleanore Griffin. The film stars Don Murray as the preacher and author Norman Vincent Peale. The cast also includes  Diana Hyland, William Windom, Virginia Christine, Carol Ohmart and Veronica Cartwright.

The film was released on December 23, 1963, by United Artists.

Plot

As a young man, Norman Vincent Peale is working in Detroit as a crime reporter for a newspaper. Saddened by the tragedies he witnesses or writes about, Peale enters a seminary. He moves to New York City, becoming a minister and writing a best-selling book, The Power of Positive Thinking, that also becomes controversial. After a considerable amount of soul-searching that leads him to the brink of leaving his vocation, Peale decides to continue with his work.

Cast
Don Murray as Norman Vincent Peale
Diana Hyland as Ruth Stafford Peale
William Windom as Reverend Clifford Peale
Virginia Christine as Anna Peale
Carol Ohmart as Evelyn Grace
Veronica Cartwright as Mary
Liam Sullivan as Dr. Arthur Gordon
June Dayton as Mrs. Gordon
Ian Wolfe as Bishop Hardwick
Charles Lampkin as Lafe
Arthur Peterson, Jr. as Instructor
Hope Summers as Mrs. Elwood Thompson
Virginia Sale as Miss S.E. Collingswood
Ed Peck as Harry the Reporter
Butch Patrick as John Peale
Tom Skerritt as Grown Leonard Peale
Bing Russell as Tom Rayburn

Critical reception

In the New York Times, film critic Howard Thompson wrote, "As a biographical tribute to one of America's best-known Protestant clergymen, the picture is thoughtful and genteel," adding that it is "a worthy movie" that "sustains an unpretentious tone from start to finish."

See also
List of American films of 1963

References

External links 
 
 

1963 films
United Artists films
American drama films
1963 drama films
Films directed by Denis Sanders
Films scored by Richard Markowitz
1960s English-language films
1960s American films